Xanten Charterhouse is a former Carthusian monastery, or charterhouse, in Xanten, North Rhine-Westphalia, Germany. The monastery was originally founded in 1417 in Flüren near Wesel but was moved to Xanten in 1628. It was suppressed in 1802 during the secularisation  of Germany under Napoleon. The buildings passed into private ownership and later into the ownership of the town of Xanten.

The upper part of the premises is now used as the town library, while on the ground floor is a bar and restaurant.

References

Sources 
 Robert Scholten: Das Karthäuserkloster Insula Reginae Caeli auf der Grave bei Wesel. In: Annalen des Historischen Vereins für den Niederrhein, 52 (1891), pp. 61–136 (online version)
 
 Michael Lehmann: Die Karthaus in Xanten. Ein Beitrag zur Gebäudegeschichte unter besonderer Berücksichtigung der Jahre 1933 bis 1945. Jahrbuch Kreis Wesel, Kreisarchiv Wesel, 2015, pp. 196–204

Carthusian monasteries in Germany
Monasteries in North Rhine-Westphalia
Xanten